In United States agricultural policy, grades and standards refers to the segregation, or classification, of agricultural commodities into groupings that share common characteristics. Grades provide a common trading language, or common reference, so that buyers and sellers can more easily determine the quality (and therefore value) of those commodities.

Two USDA agencies, the Agricultural Marketing Service and Grain Inspection, Packers, and Stockyards Administration, serve as objective sources for this information. These agencies develop common grades and standards and conduct inspection and grading services for most food and farm products, and industry pays for most of the cost through user fees. Adoption and application of official U.S. Grain Standards is authorized by the U.S. Grain Standards Act (USGSA; 7 U.S.C. 71 et seq).

References 

United States Department of Agriculture